Irv L. Slifkin is an American film writer, critic and editor, known for his work with Movies Unlimited in Philadelphia, described as one of the "world's leading video retailers and publisher of the annual encyclopedic Movies Unlimited Video Catalog". Slifkin has taught film at Temple University and has contributed to the Los Angeles Times, the Philadelphia Inquirer, the Chicago Tribune, Empire, Entertainment Weekly and Delaware Valley Magazine as a film critic. Aside from contributing to Video Hound, Slifkin is also responsible for organizing Mondo Meyer, an event in Philadelphia celebrating the work of Russ Meyer.

Slifkin is also the author of the books Groovy Movies: Far-Out Films of the Psychedelic Era (VisibleInk Press) and Filmadelphia: A Celebration of a City's Movies (Mid-Atlantic Press). He is also featured as an actor in the film Changing the Game (2012).

Slifkin also co-produced and co-wrote the three-part documentary "Time Warp: The Greatest Cult Films of All-Time," released in 2020.

References

External links
Articles at Moviefanfare.com

American film critics
American film historians
Living people
People from Philadelphia
Journalists from Pennsylvania
Historians from Pennsylvania
Year of birth missing (living people)